

Coaching staff

Competitions

China League One

Results by round

League Matches

References

Chinese football clubs 2011 season
Guangzhou City F.C. seasons